, is a Japanese actress and model.  She is also a race car driver. She was born in Chiba Prefecture.

Filmography

Futari no shiso gemu (Teeter totter for two / The see saw game), 1996, TV
Jaja uma narashi (Taming of the shrew), 1993

External links
http://www.jdorama.com/artiste.499.htm

1968 births
Living people
Japanese actresses
Japanese racing drivers
Japanese female racing drivers
Actors from Chiba Prefecture
Models from Chiba Prefecture
Sportspeople from Chiba Prefecture